Portland Press Limited is the wholly owned publishing subsidiary of The Biochemical Society. It is a publisher of journals and books in the cellular and molecular life sciences. The surplus from the sales of its publications are returned to the scientific community via the activities of The Biochemical Society.

Portland Press publishes books, a magazine, The Biochemist, and several print and online academic journals:

Biochemical Journal
Biochemical Society Symposium (online only)
Biochemical Society Transactions
Bioscience Reports
Cell Signalling Biology
Clinical Science
Essays in Biochemistry 
Neuronal Signaling

External links

Book publishing companies of the United Kingdom
Non-profit academic publishers